Balkan brass, popularly known by the Serbian name Truba ("Trumpet"), is a distinctive style of music originating in the Balkan region as a fusion between military music and folk music. In recent years, it has become popular in a techno-synth fusion throughout Europe, and in pop music in the Anglo-American sphere and throughout the world.  Songs like Worth It by Fifth Harmony have brought the style to a new audience. In traditional form, it is popular throughout the Balkans, especially in Serbia, North Macedonia, Bulgaria, Moldova, and Romania, although the turbo-folk variety attracts larger audiences. The energetic and fast beats encourage dance and are egalitarian, often resulting in participation by the entire audience; this unpretentious relationship with audiences, highly charged energy and loud and joyful performances by highly skilled musicians has contributed to its successes. Fans of bands inspired by Balkan bands, such as Gogol Bordelo, often state that it is a type of music better experienced than listened to.

It is sometimes accompanied by a kolo, a traditional South Slavic communal dance where in its simplest forms, the two steps forward, one step backward choreography, is designed to encourage the participation of all.

Performers are called trubači (трубачи) in the Serbo-Croatian, or less commonly, trubari. Some of the best known examples of acclaimed music in this style are the Goran Bregović Band and the Boban Marković Orkestar. Roma have adopted this tradition and make up a large percentage of Balkan brass bands.

The Serbian film maker Emir Kusturica has, through his films (Black Cat, White Cat), made the style popular in the international community outside the Balkans.

The biggest brass band event in the world the Guča Trumpet Festival is a 5-day annual festival with 300,000 visitors, in Guča, Serbia.

History

The music's tradition stems from the First Serbian Uprising led by Karađorđe in 1804 (Serbian revolution) when Serbs revolted against the occupying Ottoman Empire, eventually liberating Serbia. The trumpet was used as a military instrument to wake and gather soldiers and announce battles, the trumpet took on the role of entertainment during downtime, as soldiers used it to transpose popular folk songs. When the war ended, the soldiers returned to the rural life; the music entered civilian life and eventually became a common musical style, accompanying births, baptisms, weddings, the slava (family patron saint day), farewell parties for those joining military service, state and church festivals, harvesting, reaping, and during funerals of family members in the community. In 1831, the first official military band was formed by Prince Miloš in Belgrade for use in the Serbian Armed Forces. Roma have since adopted the tradition.

The formation of the first military bands in Serbia thus formed the basis of the Balkan brass band traditions and culture.

Instrumentation
A brass band is primarily made up of a large number of musicians playing brass instruments such as flugelhorns, trumpets, alto horns, helicons, euphoniums, tenor horns, tubas, baritone horns, wagner tubas, and sometimes trombones. Percussion is provided by snare drum and bass drums, traditionally davuls (also known as tapan or goč) carried by the performers. A few bands occasionally sport clash cymbals, or use a snare drum with a suspended cymbal attachment while most bands attach the cymbals to the bass drum.

The music is usually instrumental although sometimes accompanied with singing. Common song forms include the čoček and the Kolo.

Modern styles
Serbian Brass music has had a major impact on the world music scene. Introduced to western audiences through the films of Emir Kusturica featuring soundtracks by Goran Bregović, it soon spread to European dancefloors spearheaded by DJ Robert Soko's "Balkan Beats" parties in Berlin, Germany.

Traditional bands from Serbia like the Boban Marković Orkestar and from Romania as Fanfare Ciocărlia garnered worldwide attention while new bands like New York-based Balkan Beat Box or the Amsterdam Klezmer Band fused the Balkan sound with other genres like Klezmer, electronic music, or Ska. DJs and producers, most prominently Shantel from Germany, successfully mixed Serbian Brass with electronic beats.

Festivals
 Guča trumpet festival, largest trumpet festival in the world, every year for five days.
 Balkan Trafik, a yearly three-day Balkan Brass festival in Brussels, Belgium.
 Zlatne Uste Golden Festival, a yearly two-day festival in New York City.
 Guča na Krasu - Guča sul Carso, a yearly three-day  festival in Trieste.
Roma Truba Fest - a yearly festival in Kumanovo, featuring Roma brass players. Usually in September.
Pehčevo Festival of Wind Bands - a yearly festival in Pehčevo. Generally in July.

Popular culture

In movies
 Time of the Gypsies (Dom za vešanje), 1988, Emir Kusturica
 Underground, 1995, Emir Kusturica
 Black Cat, White Cat, 1998, Emir Kusturica
 Borat, 2006
 Trumpets' Republic, 2006, Stefano Missio and Alessandro Gori
 Guca!, 2006, Dusan Milic

Notable Balkan brass artists and bands
Boban Marković
Goran Bregović
Kočani Orkestar
Fanfare Ciocărlia
Taraf de Haïdouks
Fejat Sejdić
Slavic Soul Party!
Raya Brass Band
Džambo Aguševi Orkestar
Fanfara Transilvania

See also
Mehter
Balkan music
 Humppa

References

19th-century music genres
20th-century music genres
21st-century music genres
Balkan music
Serbian styles of music